Kari Brooke Jobe (born April 6, 1981) is an American contemporary Christian music singer and songwriter. Since her first album in 2009, she has received two Grammy Award nominations and ten Dove Award nominations, six of which she won.

Biography 

Kari Jobe was born in 1981, in Waco, Texas, to parents Mark and Caroline "Sandy" (née Bragg) Jobe. She was raised in Watauga and Hurst, Texas, both suburbs of Fort Worth. She has two siblings, Kristen and Caleb. Jobe began singing at the age of three and became a Christian at the age of five. She attended Oral Roberts University, Christ for the Nations Institute and Dallas Baptist University and obtained her degree in pastoral studies and psychology.

She became known with the successes "Revelation Song" and "Holy Spirit" released in 2009.

After graduation, Jobe accepted an invitation to serve as associate worship pastor at Gateway Church in Southlake, Texas, which she had been attending for six years. She worked alongside her father, Mark, who serves as campus pastor of Gateway's flagship campus in Southlake. She has traveled internationally on mission trips to lead worship. Jobe was also a member of Gateway Worship, a Christian worship band associated with Gateway Church. The group's live album, Wake Up the World, debuted at No. 2 on Billboards Christian Albums chart in 2008.

In addition to acting as a worship leader and pastor, Jobe released her first major-label album in February 2009 on the Integrity Music/Columbia Records/Gateway Create label.

 2009–2011: Kari Jobe, Le Canto 

Jobe released her self-titled debut album on February 10, 2009. The album charted at No. 67 on the Billboard 200 and No. 3 on Billboard'''s Christian music chart. A Spanish-language version of the album was released under the name Le Canto. The album Le Canto won a Dove Award in the category, Spanish Album of the Year at the 41st GMA Dove Awards.
Prior to releasing Kari Jobe, Jobe had released a compilation album, Kari Jobe, a live concert album, Throneroom Worship: Live Acoustic Worship, and a Christmas album, Bethlehem.

From her self-titled album, "I'm Singing" debuted at No. 13 on Billboards Christian singles chart. Jobe's second single, "Healer", was released in 2009 and debuted at No. 33 on Billboard's Soft A/C chart. She released the single "Adore Him" in 2009, which appeared as part of Integrity Music's compilation album Worship and Adore: A Christmas Offering.

She won two Dove Awards for Special Event Album of the Year and Spanish Language album and was nominated for New Artist of the Year.

In 2011, Jobe signed with EMI CMG Sparrow Records.

 2012–2017: Where I Find You, Majestic, Donde Te Encuentro and Majestic Revisited 

Jobe released her second recording project, Where I Find You, on January 24, 2012. The album debuted at No. 75 on the Canadian Albums Chart. The album also debuted at No. 10 on the Billboard 200. Kari released the album Where I Find You in Spanish called Donde Te Encuentro, her second album released on January 24, 2012. The album debuted at chart No. 6 on the Latin Pop Albums and on the chart No. 19 on the Top Latin Albums by Billboard.

Jobe later released her first EP, The Acoustic Sessions (Live), later that year.

Jobe received her first Grammy nomination for Where I Find You as Best Contemporary Christian Album in 2012.

In May 2013, Jobe competed in season two of GSN's The American Bible Challenge, along with Sheila Walsh and author Lisa Harper. Their charity was The A21 Campaign, an anti-trafficking organization that aims to abolish slavery.

Jobe announced the recording of a live worship album that was recorded on November 20 and 21, 2013, at the Majestic Theater in Dallas, Texas. Majestic was released on March 25, 2014, and was preceded by its first single, "Forever", on February 18.Majestic Revisited was released on September 25, 2015. The album include songs from Majestic rerecorded in the studio and in a different style.

2017–present: The Garden

"The Cause of Christ" was released on November 4, 2016, as the lead single from her fourth studio album, The Garden. Three other singles: "Heal Our Land", "Fall Afresh" and "The Garden" were released before the album's release on February 3, 2017.

 Personal life 

In August 2014, Jobe confirmed via Instagram that she became engaged to fellow Gateway Worship artist Cody Carnes. The two married on November 21, 2014.

On the red carpet at the Dove Awards 2015, Jobe announced she and her husband were expecting a son. Jobe announced in June 2018 that she and her husband were expecting their second child, who was born on February 1, 2019.

In December 2019, the couple visited the White House and prayed for President Donald Trump. They also appeared in a video praising the Trump administration. In response to criticism about the visit, the pair said, "We didn't know that we were going to take a picture in the Oval Office or know they were going to post it. I didn't know they were going to use a video interview that we did talking about how amazing it was to be in a White House leading worship."

 Discography 

 Studio albums 

 Live albums 

 Others 

 EPs 

 Singles 

 Compilation with Gateway Worship 

 2005: Kari Jobe Appearances on other albums 

 2009: "Revelation Song" (Spanish version) with Danilo Montero on Devoción 2010: "Whom Shall I Fear" with Lincoln Brewster on Real Life 2011: "You are For Me" with C3 Church Global
 2011: "Yahweh" and "Amazed (Obsession)" with Desperation Band on UPDATE:LIVE
 2011: "Wondrous Love" with Aaron Shust on This Is What We Believe
 2012: "Love Wins" with Jason Crabb on Love Is Stronger
 2012: "My God" with Desperation Band on Center of It All
 2012: "Look Upon the Lord" with Paul Baloche on The Same Love
 2013: "Crown Him (Majesty)" with Chris Tomlin on Burning Lights
 2013: "Yours Forever" with Darlene Zschech and "Victors Crown" with Darlene Zschech and Israel Houghton on Revealing Jesus
 2013: "Revelation Song" various artists on Passion: Let the Future Begin (Live)
 2014: "Forever" with Bethel Music on "You Make Me Brave: Live at the Civic"
 2014: "The One That Really Matters" with Michael W. Smith on Sovereign
 2014: "Broken" with Lecrae on Anomaly
 2016: "Surrendered" with Chris Quilala on Split the Sky
 2017: "Til the End of Time" and "Rooms" with Cody Carnes on The Darker the Night / The Brighter the Morning

Awards and nominations

Billboard Music Awards 

!Ref.
|-
| 2021 || "The Blessing" || Top Christian Song ||  || 
|}

GMA Dove Awards 

|-
| rowspan="3" | 2010 
| Herself
| Best New Artist of the Year 
| 
|-
| Le Canto
| Spanish Language Album of the Year 
| 
|-
| Glory Revealed II: The Word of God in Worship
| Special Events Album of the Year 
| 
|-
| 2014 
| Majestic
| Worship Album of the Year 
| 
|-
| rowspan="2" | 2015 
| "Forever"
| Song of the Year 
| 
|-
| Herself
| Artist of the Year 
| 
|-
| rowspan="3" | 2017
| Herself
| Contemporary Christian Artist of the Year 
| 
|- 
| rowspan="2" | The Garden
| Worship Album of the Year 
| 
|-
| Recorded Music Packaging of the Year 
| 
|-
| 2020
| "The Blessing" 
| Worship Recorded Song of the Year 
| 
|-
| rowspan="3" | 2021
| "The Blessing"
| Song of the Year
| 
|-
| rowspan="2" | The Blessing
| Worship Album of the Year
| 
|-
| Recorded Music Packaging of the Year 
| 
|-
|}

Grammy Awards 

|-
|2013 || Where I Find You|| Best Contemporary Christian Music Album || 
|-
|2021 || "The Blessing" || Best Contemporary Christian Music Performance/Song || 
|-
|2022 || The Blessing (Live)|| Best Contemporary Christian Music Album || 
|}

References

External links 

 
 Kari Jobe's Gateway Church biography

1981 births
American performers of Christian music
21st-century American singers
Christian music songwriters
Columbia Records artists
Living people
Singers from Texas
People from Waco, Texas
Performers of contemporary Christian music
Performers of contemporary worship music
Spanish-language singers of the United States
Sparrow Records artists
People from Southlake, Texas
People from Hurst, Texas
People from Tarrant County, Texas
21st-century American women singers